Callisia gentlei is a species of flowering plant in the spiderwort family, Commelinaceae, that is native to southern Mexico, Guatemala, Belize, and Honduras.

Varieties

Callisia gentlei var. elegans (Alexander ex H.E.Moore) D.R.Hunt (syn. C. elegans Alexander ex H.E.Moore) - Oaxaca, Chiapas, Guatemala, Honduras
Callisia gentlei var. gentlei - Belize, Yucatán Peninsula
Callisia gentlei var. macdougallii (Miranda) D.R.Hunt - Chiapas

References

External links

gentlei
Plants described in 1954
Flora of Central America
Flora of Mexico